Buckmanville Historic District is a national historic district located at Buckmanville, Upper Makefield Township, Bucks County, Pennsylvania.  The district includes 12 contributing buildings and 1 contributing structure in the village of Buckmanville.  All of the buildings were built between 1820 and 1875, and reflective of the Greek Revival and Federal styles. Notable buildings are the William Atkinson / William Ellis House, Samuel Atkinson Farm, George Buckman House and Property, Silas L. Atkinson House, William Worthington / Lewis Worstall House, Barclay J. Smith / Alice Leedom House, and Barclay J. Smith Double House.

It was added to the National Register of Historic Places in 2002.

Gallery

References

Historic districts in Bucks County, Pennsylvania
Federal architecture in Pennsylvania
Greek Revival architecture in Pennsylvania
Historic districts on the National Register of Historic Places in Pennsylvania
National Register of Historic Places in Bucks County, Pennsylvania